Secunda, a variant of the number two (2), may refer to:

 Secunda (Hexapla), the first known Hebrew-Greek transliteration of The Old Testament, attributed to Author Origen
 Secunda, Mpumalanga, a Sasol fuel company developed town in South Africa
 Rufina and Secunda, Roman virgin-martyrs and Christian saints
 Don E. Secunda, founder of U.S. Gas and Electric
 Sholom Secunda (1894–1974), American composer of Ukrainian-Jewish descent
 Thomas Secunda, co-founder of Bloomberg L.P.